James "Jimi" Lewis (born 5 July 1974 in Lydney, Gloucestershire) is an English field hockey goalkeeper, who was a member of the Great Britain squad that finished ninth at the 2004 Summer Olympics in Athens.

He was second choice behind Simon Mason. Lewis, also nicknamed "Lewi", played club hockey for Cannock and Havant and is currently with Gross Flottbeker in Germany. He made his international debut in Malaysia in 1994, playing against South Africa.

From 1. of March 2016 onwards, Jimi coaches the German DHB Hockey National Team Goalkeepers.

Jimi often travels to Spain, and coaches hockey for Marshland High School in Norfolk along with another former international, Paul Swinburn.

References
 
 
 Hockey: Jimi Lewis geht zum DHB

External links
 

1974 births
Living people
English male field hockey players
Olympic field hockey players of Great Britain
British male field hockey players
Field hockey players at the 2004 Summer Olympics
People from Lydney
Sportspeople from Gloucestershire
Cannock Hockey Club players
Havant Hockey Club players
2002 Men's Hockey World Cup players